Talk Show is the first and only album by American singer Shae Jones. It was released on January 26, 1999 through Uptown Records. The album featured heavy input from Shep Crawford and Jones' mentor Montell Jordan, who served as an executive producer, producer, songwriter, arranger and provided background vocals for the album. The album found only mild success on the R&B and Top Heatseekers charts. 

Shae was originally Montell’s background singer, and did studio work and demos for him. After signing a record deal with Uptown Records, she began recording and completed her debut album in 1998. 

The lead single, "Talk Show Shhh!", was released in October 1998, and peaked at number 88 on the Billboard Hot 100, and number 17 on Billboard’s Hot R&B Singles chart, staying on the chart for 20 weeks. It was featured on the soundtrack to the film Ringmaster. The follow-up single from the album, “Bad Boy” (featuring Ja Rule), released in April 1999, topped Billboard’s Bubbling Under Hot R&B Singles chart. "Everytime" was released as the third and final single in September 1999, and managed to peak at number 33 on the US Adult R&B Airplay chart, as well as number 11 on Billboard’s Bubbling Under Hot R&B Singles chart.

Track listing

Charts

References

1999 debut albums
Universal Records albums
Uptown Records albums